Let's Go Bang is the second studio album by American actress and singer Jennifer Love Hewitt.

It was released by Atlantic Records on September 12, 1995. It is also the first Hewitt album distributed by Atlantic. The producer, Angelo Montrone, had "noticed her talents" and brought her to the attention of then CEO of Atlantic Records, Doug Morris who then signed her. The album was received with enthusiasm by several program directors at pop radio, however, with the departure of Doug Morris from Atlantic in 1995 the plans for promotion were canceled which led to the album's commercial failure, failing to chart on the US Billboard 200.

The album features contributions from Pino Palladino, Steve Ferrone, John Robinson, and Harvey Mason.

One of the album's tracks, "Free to Be a Woman", written by Hewitt and Angelo Montrone, would go on to become the theme song for the series The Modern Girl, that aired on the Style Network.

The album has been praised since its release mostly because of the LP's rich infusion of new jack swing, house, quiet storm, disco, spoken word, jazz, acoustic and new age into Hewitt's musical input.

Track listing

Personnel

 Jennifer Love Hewitt – lead vocals, backing vocals
 Angelo Montrone – synthesizer, piano
Additional musicians
 Hugh McCracken – electric guitar
 Paul Pesco – electric guitar
 Michael Thompson – electric guitar
 Paul Jackson Jr. – acoustic guitar
 Dean Parks – acoustic guitar
 Peter Bliss – guitar
 John Robinson – drums, hi-hat
 Harvey Mason – drums, snare drums
 Steve Ferrone – drums
 Ricky Lawson – drums
 Pino Palladino – bass
 Freddie Washington – bass
 Danny Wilensky – saxophone
 Carol Steele – percussion, handclapping, cowbell
 Sheila E. – percussion
 Ben Wittman – percussion
 Diva Gray – backing vocals
 Rosa Russ – backing vocals
 Vaneese Thomas – backing vocals
 Bill Meyers – conductor
 Steve Richards – cello
 Larry Corbett – cello
 Paula Hochhalter – cello
 Suzie Katayama – cello
 Armen Ksadjikian – cello
 Daniel Smith – cello
 Karen Jones – violin
 Peter Kent – violin
 Endre Granat – violin
 Denyse Buffum – viola
 Bruce Dukov – violin
 Berj Garabedian – violin
 Harris Goldman – violin
 Sheldon Sanov – violin
 Mark Sazer – violin
 Haim Shtrum – violin
 Robert Peterson – violin
 Rachel Robinson – violin
 Valerie Vigoda - violin

Legacy

For many years, audiences misinterpreted the meaning of going to “bang” and mistook it as a sexual innuendo.

In a 2005 interview with Maxim, Hewitt was asked to elaborate on the meaning of the song: “It was supposed to be this dance called the “Bang”, and the song never hit so we never came up with the dance. Everybody just thought I was a really dirty 16-year-old.”

Production
 Producer: Angelo Montrone
 Executive producer: Doug Morris
 Engineers: Michael O'Reilly, Al Schmitt, Steve Sykes, Steve Boyer, Matt Curry, Joe Ferla, Dan Gellert, Michael Wallace
 Vocals engineered by: Scott Sebring
 Assistant engineers: Scott Austin, John Hendrickson, Alvaro Alencar, Jerome Chaulin, Peter Doell, Tony Gonzales, Jay Militscher, Rory Romano, Michael Wallace
 Mixing: Ray Bardani, Michael O'Reilly, Al Schmitt
 Mixing assistant: Matt Curry
 Mastering: Ted Jensen
 Keyboard programming: Angelo Montrone
 Rhythm programming: Angelo Montrone
 String arrangements: Bill Meyers
 Bass arrangement: Angelo Montrone, Michael O'Reilly
 Production coordination: Jill Dell'Abate
 Art direction: Liz Barrett
 Photography: Albert Sanchez

References

1995 albums
Jennifer Love Hewitt albums